is a former Japanese football player. He played for Japan national team.

Club career
Kawanishi was born in Hiroshima Prefecture on October 9, 1938. After graduating from Rikkyo University, he joined his local club Toyo Industries in 1961. In 1965, Toyo Industries joined new league Japan Soccer League. He retired in 1966. He did not play in the league.

National team career
In December 1959, when he was a Rikkyo University student, he was selected Japan national team for 1960 Summer Olympics qualification. At this qualification, on December 20, he debuted against South Korea. He played 8 games for Japan until 1962.

Club statistics

National team statistics

References

External links
 
 Japan National Football Team Database

1938 births
Living people
Rikkyo University alumni
Association football people from Hiroshima Prefecture
Japanese footballers
Japan international footballers
Japan Soccer League players
Sanfrecce Hiroshima players
Association football midfielders